Denizens of Earthdawn Volume One is a supplement published by FASA  in 1994 for the fantasy role-playing game Earthdawn.

Contents
Denizens of Earthdawn Volume One, by Louis Prosperi, Tom Dowd, Marc Gascoigne, Shane Lacy Hensley, Sean R. Rhoades, Carl Sargent, and John Terra, is the first of two volumes that describes the eight major races of the Earthdawn world. This volume delves into elves, humans, t'skrang, and windlings, including history, society, rituals and biology. It also provides Disciplines particular to each race, details new talents, and gives rules specifically intended for each race.

Reception
In the November 1995 edition of Dragon (Issue #223), Rick Swan called this book, "beautifully written and illustrated." He commended the book for its "meticulous, mind-boggling detail, the kind you expect from Ph.D. candidates working on their dissertations."

References

Earthdawn supplements
Role-playing game supplements introduced in 1994